Friendship is a town in the Totness resort in the Coronie district in Suriname. Friendship is a former cotton plantation founded in 1824. The village of Friendship is to the north of the East-West Link, and Totness is to the south of the road. A clinic is located in the town, and serves both Totness and Friendship. The school in Totness is shared with Friendship.

References

External links

Populated places in Coronie District